= Jean Grancolas =

Jean Grancolas was a theologian, liturgist and doctor of the Sorbonne.

Having received the degree of Doctor of Theology of the faculty of Paris in 1685, he became chaplain to the brother of Louis XIV. He pronounced the funeral oration of this prince, but his panegyric displeased the son of the deceased, the Duke of Orléans, future Regent of France, who dismissed him from his house. His unfortunate essay caused Grancolas to abandon official eloquence, and, having devoted much time to studying liturgical ceremonies and comparing the various usages with the text of the ancient writers who have given an account of them, he undertook to communicate to the public his observations on this head. His first work dealt with the antiquity of the ceremonies of the sacraments. The favourable reception accorded this endeavour led Grancolas to publish the next year a study of the custom of dipping the consecrated bread in the wine. However, the author was desirous of participating in less severe questions, and wished to engage in theological polemics. At that time the matter of Quietism was creating a great stir in the world, and Grancolas conceived the idea of plunging into the quarrel by a refutation of the heresy which he entitled "Le Quiétisme contraire au doctrine des sacrements" (Quietism contrary to the doctrine of the Sacraments), and which appeared in 1693.

This work contains a history of the life, doctrine, and condemnation of Molinos. Grancolas herein sets forth the principles of the Spanish mystic and of his followers, which principles he proceeds to refute from Scripture and the tradition of the Fathers. This new work attracted little attention, and shared the fate of so many other theological demonstrations called forth by the Quietist heresy and scarcely remembered to-day. However from his own point of view, Grancolas is master of his subject and handles it firmly, but he displays the usual qualities and defects found in his other works, namely, an erudition of the first order derived from original sources, a profound and wide acquaintance with the question he treats and germane topics, a too evident rudeness of expression and lack of culture, as well as an obvious disdain for composition.

His works offend chiefly in this last particular. Grancolas scarcely took the trouble to arrange and connect the points of an argument, being satisfied to throw them into a heap, and deprived them by this disorder of a part of their monstrative value. Despite these defects all works of Grancolas retain their value as books of reference. His collections of texts do not do away the necessity of having recourse to originals although the translations he gives are generally exact and very clear, but he is useful, inasmuch as he omits nothing essential and also, if necessary in determining the sense of a word. An original mind, he belongs to the theological school of Thomassin and Petau who readily replace discussion by the exposition of traditional opinions in chronological order, but he scarcely troubles to develop the sense of his texts. His real originality is as a liturgist, although even here he does not rise above the second rank. Ingenious without being systematic, imaginative without being adventurous, the commentary in most of his works is valuable, especially in the "Ancien sacramentaire de l'Eglise" and in the "Commentaire sur le Bréviaire romain".

His principal writings are: "Traité de l'antiquité des cérémonies des sacrements" (Paris, 1692); "De l'Intinction ou de la coutume de tremper le pain consacré dans le vin" (Paris, 1693); "Le Quiétisme contraire à la doctrine des sacrements" (Paris, 1693); "Instructions sur la religion tirées de l'Ecriture sainte" (Paris, 1693) "La Science des confesseurs ou la manière d'administrer le sacrement de Pénitence" (Paris, 1696); "Histoire de la communion sous une seule espèce, avec un Traité de la concomitance, ou de la Présence du Corps et du Sang de Jésus Christ sous chaque espèce" (Paris, 1696); "L'ancienne discipline de l'Eglise sur la Confession et sur les pratiques les plus importantes de la Pénitence" (Paris, 1697); "Heures sacrées ou exercice du chrétien pour entendre la messe et pour approcher des sacrements, tiré de l'Ecriture Sainte" (Paris, 1697); "Tradition de l'Eglise sur le péché originel et sur la réprobation des enfants morts sans baptême" (Paris, 1698); "L'ancien pénitentiel de l'Eglise ou les pénitences que l'on imposait autrefois pour chaque péché et les devoirs de tous les états et professions présents par les saints Peres et par les conciles" (Paris, 1698); "Les anciennes liturgies ou la manière dont on à dit la sainte Messe dans chaque siècle dans les Eglises d'Orient et dans celles d'Occident" (Paris, 1697); "L'ancienne sacrementaire de l'Eglise, où sont toutes les pratiques qui s'observaient dans l'administration des sacrements chez les Grecs et chez les Latins" (2 vols., Paris, 1690-99); "La morale pratique de l'Eglise sur les préceptes du Décalogue: ou la manière de conduire les âmes dans le sacrement de pénitence" (2 vols., Paris, 1701); "La tradition de l'Eglise dans le soulagement des esclaves" [J- G. (?)] (Paris, 1703); "Traité de la Messe et de l'office divin" (Paris, 1713); "Dissertations sur les messes quotidiennes et sur la confession" (Paris, 1715); "Le Bréviaire des laïques ou l'Office Divine abrégé" (Paris, 1715); "Les catechismes de Saint Cyrille de Jerusalem avec les notes et des dissertations" (Paris, 1715); "Commentaire historique sur le Bréviaire romain" (Paris, 1700, and Venice, 1734); "La critique abrégée des ouvrages des auteurs ecclésiastiques" (2 vols., Paris, 1716); "Instruction sur le Jubilé avec des résolutions de plusleurs cas sur cette matiere" (Paris, 1722); "Histoire abrege de l'Eglise de la Ville et de Université de Paris" (Paris, 1728); "L'imitation de Jésus Christ, traduction nouvelle précédée d'une Dissertation sur l'auteur de ce livre" (Paris, 1729). Grancolas favours the claims of Ubertino of Casale, a Fransciscan who lived shortly before the fourteenth century, to the authorship of the Imitation.
